Beacock is a surname. Notable people with the surname include:

Brian Beacock (born 1966), American film, television, and voice actor
Gary Beacock (born 1960), English footballer
Lucy-mae Beacock, cast member of Matilda the Musical